The 2006 FIBA World Championship was the 15th FIBA World Championship, the international basketball world championship for men's national teams. The tournament was hosted by Japan and held from 19 August to 3 September 2006. It was co-organised by the International Basketball Federation (FIBA), Japan Basketball Association (JABBA) and the 2006 Organising Committee.

For the first time since 1986, the World Championship was contested by 24 nations, eight more than in 2002. As a result, group rounds were conducted in four cities, with the knockout rounds being hosted by Saitama City.

Spain won the tournament by beating Greece 70–47 in the championship final. Spain won all nine games they played. Spain's gold medal in this tournament was the first medal Spain had ever won in a FIBA World Championship. Pau Gasol also became the first Spaniard to win the MVP award. It was the first time a country has won all nine of its games since 1994 when the United States won all nine games and took the gold medal home. The bronze medal was won by the United States, who defeated Argentina, 96–81, in the third place game, after a semi-finals loss to Greece. Up to 2019, including the 2014 tournament, it has been the only tournament where neither Yugoslavia or the USA have reached the final. The 2006 tournament marked the final appearance of Serbia and Montenegro as they broke up into the independent nations of Serbia and Montenegro after a successful independence referendum in Montenegro in May.

Seventeen years after the 2006 edition, Japan will once again host the FIBA World Championships, now called the World Cup in 2023 in Okinawa along with the Philippines and Indonesia.

Venues

Qualification 

There were 24 teams taking part in the 2006 World Cup of Basketball. 
 Host nation: 1 berth
 2004 Summer Olympics: 12 teams competing for 1 berth, removed from that country's FIBA zone
 FIBA Africa: 12 teams competing for 3 berths
 FIBA Oceania: 2 teams competing for 2 berths
 FIBA Americas: 10 teams competing for 4 berths
 FIBA Asia: 16 teams competing for 3 berths
 FIBA Europe: 16 teams competing for 6 berths
 Wild card: 4 berths

Qualified teams

Squads 

At the start of tournament, all 24 participating countries had 12 players on their roster.

Competing nations 
The following national teams competed:

Japan qualified as the host country, and Italy, Puerto Rico, Serbia and Montenegro, and Turkey gained FIBA wild-card invitations. Argentina qualified as the champion of the 2004 Olympics. The remaining 18 countries qualified through their continents' qualifying tournaments (six from Europe, four from the Americas, three from each of Asia and Africa and two from Oceania).

The draw for the 2006 World Championship was held in Tokyo on 15 January 2006. In the preliminary rounds, Group A played at Sendai, Group B at Hiroshima, Group C at Hamamatsu and Group D at Sapporo. The Medal Rounds were played at Saitama.

Group stage

Group A (Sendai) 

19 August 2006

20 August 2006

21 August 2006

23 August 2006

24 August 2006

Group B (Hiroshima) 

19 August 2006

20 August 2006

21 August 2006

23 August 2006

24 August 2006

Group C (Hamamatsu) 

19 August 2006

20 August 2006

22 August 2006

23 August 2006

24 August 2006

Group D (Sapporo) 

19 August 2006

20 August 2006

22 August 2006

23 August 2006

24 August 2006

Knockout stage 

Venue: Saitama Super Arena

Round of 16

Quarterfinals

5th–8th classification

Semifinals

Seventh place playoff

Fifth place playoff

Semifinals

Third place playoff

Final 

Since the inaugural competition in 1950 the five competing countries for the title had always been two of Argentina, United States, Soviet Union, Brazil and Yugoslavia, one of which always being either United States or Yugoslavia. After the dissolution of the Soviet Union, Russia took its place in the finals of 1994 and 1998, and after the breakup of Yugoslavia, FR Yugoslavia took its place in the finals of 1998 and 2002. The 2006 final was the first and only one in which none of these five teams competed.

The final was an unexpectedly one-sided affair, with Spain dominating from the beginning and limiting Greece to just 47 points, fewer than the Greeks had scored in any single game in the tournament, and less than half what Greece had scored against the US in the semifinals. Spain won despite having lost power forward Pau Gasol, who was ultimately named the tournament's most valuable player, to injury in a semifinal match against Argentina.

Final rankings 

 Teams that were eliminated at the round of 16 are officially tied for 9th.
 Teams that were 5th at their preliminary rounds are officially tied for 17th.
 Teams that were 6th at their preliminary rounds are officially tied for 21st.

Awards

All-Tournament Team 

  Pau Gasol
  Jorge Garbajosa
  Carmelo Anthony
  Manu Ginóbili
  Theodoros Papaloukas

Leading scorers

Referees 
For the World Championship, FIBA selected 40 professional referees.

Sponsorship 
• McDonald's

References

External links 

 
 
 

 
2006
International basketball competitions hosted by Japan
2006 in basketball
2006 in Japanese sport
August 2006 sports events in Asia
September 2006 sports events in Asia